Emil Dăncuș (born 4 October 1974) is a retired Romanian football midfielder.

References

External links

1974 births
Living people
Romanian footballers
Liga I players
Liga II players
ACF Gloria Bistrița players
FC Astra Giurgiu players
CS Gaz Metan Mediaș players
FC Stal Alchevsk players
Association football midfielders
Romanian expatriate footballers
Expatriate footballers in Ukraine
Romanian expatriate sportspeople in Ukraine